Big Hill, in the City of Greater Bendigo, forms part of the Big Hill range to the immediate south of the city of Bendigo, Victoria, Australia. It is the southern part of the rim of forested hills surrounding the Bendigo Valley in which the city of Bendigo is located. The Calder Highway and the Midland Highway, which join to form the main route into Bendigo from Melbourne, pass through a prominent cutting in Big Hill as the southern gateway to Bendigo. The route over Big Hill has marked the main southern entrance to the Bendigo Valley since 1851.

Big Hill has also given its name to the rural locality to the south of the city of Bendigo containing the source of the Bendigo Creek and nearby Crusoe Reservoir. Big Hill Primary School and Big Hill Vineyard are also located in Big Hill.

Etymology
Big Hill is, as its name suggests, a big hill. Originally known as "the Big Hill", it forms a highly-visible topographic feature approaching the Bendigo Valley to the north of Mount Alexander as the surrounding landscape between Mount Alexander and Big Hill is only gently undulating.

History
Since the official discovery of gold on Bendigo Creek in the Bendigo Valley in October 1851, the route over Big Hill has remained the main southern entrance to the Bendigo Valley.

Granite for the entrance portal of the 390-metre long Big Hill Railway Tunnel, constructed in 1862, was locally quarried in the Big Hill range.

References

Towns in Victoria (Australia)
Bendigo
Suburbs of Bendigo